"I'm That Type of Guy" is the second single released from LL Cool J's third album, Walking with a Panther.  It was released in 1989 for Def Jam Recordings and was produced by Dwayne Simon and LL Cool J. The song would prove to be the most successful single from the album, making it to #15 on the Billboard Hot 100 and #7 on the Hot R&B/Hip-Hop songs. Despite being one of LL Cool J's biggest early hits, the song was not included on his 1996 greatest hits album, All World: Greatest Hits, however it was included in that album's follow-up All World 2, released in 2009.

The song also contains the  sample "The March of the Winkies" from the film, The Wizard of Oz and on July 24, 1989 it was certified gold by the RIAA.

The music video for the song was directed by Scott Kalvert and produced by Amy Raskin and David Horgan

Track listing

A-side
"I'm That Type of Guy" (J.T. Smith, D. Simon, S. Ett) - 5:16

B-side
"It Gets No Rougher" (J.T. Smith, H. Shocklee, K. Shocklee, E.Sadler) - 5:26

45 RPM single:

A-side
"I'm That Type of Guy" (J.T. Smith, D. Simon, S. Ett) - 3:23

B-side
"It Gets No Rougher" (J.T. Smith, H. Shocklee, K. Shocklee, E.Sadler) - 3:36

Charts

1989 singles
LL Cool J songs
Songs written by LL Cool J
1989 songs
Def Jam Recordings singles
Songs written by Dwayne Simon